The Tiphiidae (also known as the tiphiid wasps) are a family of large, solitary wasps whose larvae are parasitoids of various beetle larvae, especially those in the superfamily Scarabaeoidea. Until recently, this family contained several additional subfamilies, but multiple studies have independently confirmed that these comprise a separate lineage, and are now classified in the family Thynnidae.

The females of some Brachycistidinae are wingless, and hunt ground-dwelling (fossorial) beetle larvae. The prey is paralysed with the female's sting, and an egg is lain on it so the wasp larva has a ready supply of food. As some of the ground-dwelling scarab species attacked by tiphiids are pests, some of these wasps are considered beneficial as biological control agents.

Taxonomy 
Tiphiid genera are classified as follows:

Subfamily Brachycistidinae 
Acanthetropis Wasbauer, 1958
Brachycistellus Baker, 1907
Brachycistina Malloch, 1926
Brachycistis Fox, 1893
Brachymaya Kimsey & Wasbauer 1999
Colocistis Krombein, 1942
Dolichetropis Wasbauer, 1968
Glyptacros Mickel & Krombein, 1942
Hadrocistis Wasbauer, 1968
Paraquemaya Kimsey & Wasbauer, 1999
Sedomaya Kimsey & Wasbauer, 1999
Stilbopogon  Mickel & Krombein, 1942

Subfamily Tiphiinae 
Cabaraxa Nagy, 1974
Cyanotiphia  Cameron, 1907
Epomidiopteron Romand, 1835
Icronatha Nagy, 1967
Krombeinia Pate, 1947
Ludita Nagy, 1967
Mallochessa Allen, 1972
Megatiphia Kimsey, 1993
Neotiphia Malloch, 1918
Paratiphia Sichel, 1864
Pseudotiphia Ashmead 1903
Tiphia Fabricius, 1775

Examples
Tiphia femorata Linden 1827
Tiphia minuta Fabricius, 1775

References

Further reading 
 Arnett, R. H. Jr. (2000) Segunda edición. American insects. CRC Press, Boca Raton, Londres,New York, Washington, D. C. 
 Borror, D. J., DeLong, D. M., Triplehorn, C. A.(1976) cuarta edición. An introduction to the study of insects. Holt, Rinehart and Winston. New York, Chicago. 
 Bugguide.net. Family Tiphiidae - Tiphiid Wasps

 
Apocrita families
Insects used as insect pest control agents